Ashok Lavasa (born 21 October 1957) is a retired 1980 batch Indian Administrative Service officer of Haryana cadre and was one of the two Election Commissioners of India. He has also served as the Finance Secretary of India, Environment, Forests and Climate Change Secretary of India and Civil Aviation Secretary of India. He has been appointed as the Vice President of Asian Development Bank (ADB).

Education 
Ashok Lavasa did his schooling from Belgaum Military School. Ashok Lavasa is a graduate (BA Honours) from Deshbandhu college and a postgraduate (MA) in English from University of Delhi, he has an MBA degree from Southern Cross University in New South Wales, Australia. In addition, has an MPhil in defence and strategic studies.

Career

Before IAS 
Before being appointed as an IAS officer, Lavasa taught literature in the Delhi University. He also had a stint with the State Bank of India as a probationary officer.

As an IAS officer 

Lavasa has served in key positions for both the Government of India and the Government of Haryana, like as Principal Secretary and Financial Commissioner (Renewable Energy Sources), Principal Secretary and Financial Commissioner (Power), Chief Coordinator (Industries), resident commissioner of Haryana, managing director of Haryana State Federation of Co-operative Sugar Mills (HSFCOSML), director of Haryana State Industrial Development Corporation (HSIDC), managing director of Haryana Tourism Corporation (HTC), and as the deputy commissioner and district magistrate of Jind and Gurgaon districts in the Haryana government, and as the Union Finance Secretary, Union Environment, Forests and Climate Change Secretary, Union Civil Aviation Secretary, special secretary in the Ministry of Power, joint secretary in the Ministry of Home Affairs, and as a joint secretary in the Department of Economic Affairs of the Ministry of Finance in the Indian government.

Civil Aviation Secretary 
Lavasa was appointed as the Union Civil Aviation Secretary by the Appointments Committee of the Cabinet (ACC) in December 2013, he assumed office on 1 January 2014, and demitted it on 29 August 2014, when he was appointed as the Union Environment, Forests and Climate Change Secretary.

Environment, Forests and Climate Change Secretary 
Lavasa was appointed as the Union Environment, Forests and Climate Change Secretary by the Appointments Committee of the Cabinet (ACC) in August 2014, he assumed office on 29 August 2014, and demitted it on 30 April 2016, when he was appointed as the Union Expenditure Secretary.

Expenditure Secretary 
Lavasa was appointed as the Union Expenditure Secretary by the Appointments Committee of the Cabinet (ACC) in April 2016, he assumed office on 30 April 2016, and demitted it and simultaneously superannuated from service on 30 October 2017.

As the seniormost secretary in the Ministry of Finance after the retirement of Ratan Watal, Lavasa was designated as Finance Secretary in May 2016.

Post-retirement

Election Commissioner of India 
Post-retirement, Lavasa was appointed as one of the two Election Commissioners of India in January 2018. Lavasa assumed charge as Election Commissioner on 23 January 2018.

Mr Lavasa made headlines in 2019 after a dissenting opinion on a panel's ruling of complaints against Prime Minister Narendra Modi and Amit Shah during the Lok Sabha election campaign.

Six complaints were filed against PM Modi. Lavasa disagreed with his panel colleagues in some of these cases.

He soon stopped attending meetings, saying "minority decisions" were being "suppressed in a manner contrary to well-established conventions observed by multi-member statutory bodies".

In December 2019, Mr Lavasa in an article in The Indian Express wrote: "The honest, however, go on regardless, perhaps driven by an inner force that borders on recklessness. A society that creates hurdles which exhaust the honest or wound them paves the path for its own perdition".

This was two months after an income tax notice was sent to his wife, Novel S Lavasa, over alleged discrepancies in filings. Sources had said the information had been sought "related to foreign exchange". Mrs Lavasa said she had "paid all taxes due" and "disclosed all income" and that she was cooperating.

He will take charge as Vice president of Asian Development Bank (ADB) from 31 August 2020. But he has apparently not yet decided whether or not to join the Asian Development Bank as one of its vice presidents.

Work 
 
Lavasa, Ashok (2021): An Ordinary Life: Portrait of an Indian Generation. Harper India

References

External links 

 
 

Living people
Indian Administrative Service officers
Delhi University alumni
Southern Cross University alumni
1957 births
Members of the Election Commission of India